Denmark competed in the 2022 European Championships in Munich from August 11 to August 22, 2022.

Medallists

Competitors
The following is the list of number of competitors in the Championships:

Athletics

Beach Volleyball

Denmark has qualified 1 male and female pair each.

Cycling

Road

Men

Women

Gymnastics

Denmark entered two male and five female athletes.

Men

Qualification

Women

Qualification

Rowing

Men

Women

Sport climbing

Boulder

Triathlon

Mixed

References

2022
Nations at the 2022 European Championships
European Championships